William Button may refer to:

 William I Button (died 1264), Bishop of Bath and Wells
 William II Button (died 1274), Bishop of Bath and Wells
 William Button (died 1547), MP for Chippenham
 William Button (1526–1591), member of the Parliament of England for Marlborough
 Sir William Button, 1st Baronet (c. 1584–1655), of the Button baronets, MP for Wiltshire and Morpeth
 William Butten or Button (died 1620), Mayflower passenger
 Sir William Button, 2nd Baronet (c. 1614–1660), of the Button baronets
 William Stammers Button (1795–1876), English settler in Tasmania; first mayor of Launceston
 William Robert Button (1895–1921), American Medal of Honor recipient
 William John Button (died 1969), British Empire Gallantry Medal recipient

See also
 Button (name)